Phaëton (LWV 61) is a tragédie en musique in a prologue and five acts by Jean-Baptiste Lully. Philippe Quinault wrote the French libretto after a story from Ovid's Metamorphoses. It can be read as an allegorical depiction of the punishment awaiting those mortals who dare to raise themselves as high as the "sun" (i.e. the Sun King).

Phaëton was the first lyric tragedy of Lully and Quinault to receive its world premiere at the Palace of Versailles, where it was given without stage machinery on or about 6 January 1683. The Paris Opera also performed it at the Théâtre du Palais-Royal (beginning on 27 April), where it was very successful with the general public. The performances ceased for thirty days of mourning following the death of the queen on 30 July 1683, but resumed thereafter and continued until 12 or 13 January 1684. The opera was revived at the Palais-Royal in 1692, 1702, 1710, 1721, 1730, and 1742. It was sometimes referred to as "the people's opera", just as Lully's Isis came to be called "the musician's opera" (because of its score), and his Atys, as "the king's opera" (one of Louis XIV's favorite works).

Roles
{| class="wikitable" style="margin: 1em auto 1em auto"
|-
! Role !! Description     !! Voice type   !! Premiere cast, 
|-
! colspan="4" | Prologue
|-
| Astrée  || Astraea, a goddess. || soprano || Fanchon Moreau
|-
| Saturne  || Saturn, a god from a former age. || bass || ?
|-
| colspan="4" | Companions of Astraea; Followers of Saturn and Astraea
|-
! colspan="4" | Tragedy
|-
| Libie || Libya, daughter of Merops by his first wife || soprano || ?
|-
| Théone || Theona, daughter of Proteus, Phaëtons lover. || soprano || ?
|-
| Phaëton  || the son of Clymene and the Sun. || haute-contre (high tenor) || Louis Gaulard Dumesny
|-
| Climène || Clymene, daughter of Oceanus, second wife of Merops. || soprano || ? 
|-
| Protée || Proteus, a sea god, Triton'''s herdsman. || bass || ?
|-
| Triton || a sea god, brother of Clymene. || haute-contre || Claude Desvoyes
|-
| Épaphus || a son of Jupiter, Libyas lover. || bass || ?
|-
| Mérops || king of Egypt || bass || ?
|-
| Un roi Éthiopien || a king from Ethiopia || bass || ?
|-
| Un roi Indien || a king from India || bass || ?
|-
| Une des Heures du jour || an Hour of the day || soprano || ?
|-
| L'Automne || Autumn, a god || bass || ?
|-
| Le Soleil || the Sun, a god || haute-contre || ?
|-
| Une bergère Égyptienne || An Egyptian shepherdess || soprano || ?
|-
| La Terre || the Earth, a goddess || haute-contre || Claude Desvoyes
|-
| Jupiter || king of the gods || bass || ?
|-
| colspan="4" | Followers of Triton; Kings and Tributaries of Merops; Egyptians, Ethiopians, Indians; followers of Phaëton; Priestesses; Worshippers of Isis; Furies; Hours of the Day; Four Seasons
|}

Synopsis
Phaëton, the prideful and reckless son of the Sun and the ocean nymph Clymene, is driven to abandon his lover Theona by his ambition for the hand of Libya, daughter of the king of Egypt. On the day of the wedding, Libya's enraged lover Epaphus, himself the son of Jupiter, disputes Phaëton's claim to divine lineage. Desiring to prove himself, Phaëton convinces his father to allow him to drive the sun-chariot for one day. In the course of his flight he loses control of the horses, threatening the earth beneath with fiery destruction; Epaphus entreats his father to put an end to the danger, and Jupiter strikes the chariot down with a thunderbolt. Phaëton falls to his death.

Recordings
 Lully: Phaéton / Marc Minkowski, Les Musiciens du Louvre. Erato (1993). Catalogue# 91737 (2 CDs)
 Christophe Rousset Aparté, 2 CDs, 2011

References
Notes

Sources
 1742 libretto: Phaeton, Tragedie représentée pour la première fois à Versailles devant le Roi, le mercredi 6 janvier 1683 et à Paris (...) Remise au théâtre le mardi 13 novembre 1742. Paris: Ballard (accessible for free online at Gallica - B.N.F.)
 Brenac, Jean-Claude. "Phaëton" page, Le magazine de l'opéra baroque website (Accessed 6 September 2006), (French only)
 La Gorce, Jérôme de (2001). "Lully. (1) Jean-Baptiste Lully [Lulli, Giovanni Battista] (i)" in Sadie 2001.
 Lajarte, Théodore (1878). Bibliothèque musicale du Théâtre de l'Opéra, volume 1 [1671–1791]. Paris: Librairie des Bibliophiles (copy at Internet Archive)
 "Phaëton (1683)" pages, The Jean-Baptiste Lully Collection website, University of North Texas Music Library (Accessed 6 September 2006). 
 Parvopassu, Clelia, Phaéton, in Gelli, Piero & Poletti, Filippo (ed), Dizionario dell'opera 2008, Milan, Baldini Castoldi Dalai, 2007, pp. 1015-1016,  (reproduced online at Opera Manager)
 Pitou, Spire (1983–1990). The Paris Opéra: An Encyclopedia of Operas, Ballets, Composers, and Performers (3 volumes). Westport, Connecticut: Greenwood Press. .
 Rosow, Lois (1992). "Phaëton" in Sadie 1992, vol. 3, p. 991.
 Sadie, Stanley, editor (1992). The New Grove Dictionary of Opera (4 volumes). London: Macmillan. .
 Sadie, Stanley, editor (2001). The New Grove Dictionary of Music and Musicians'', 2nd edition. London: Macmillan.  (hardcover),  (eBook), and Grove Music Online.

External links
  Phaëton at the University of North Texas Digital Collections website: High-resolution images of the 1683 edition
  Phaëton at the University of North Texas Digital Collections website: High-resolution images of the 1709 edition
 

Operas by Jean-Baptiste Lully
Tragédies en musique
French-language operas
Operas
1683 operas
Operas based on Metamorphoses